Book Aid International is a UK registered charity which provides books and supports libraries in Africa and around the world. Every year the charity sends books to public and community libraries as well as libraries in prisons, refugee camps, hospitals, schools and universities. The charity works in close partnership with libraries and also helps libraries develop their services through its library support projects and programmes. In 2019, an estimated 19 million people read the books which Book Aid International provided.

History 
Book Aid International was founded in 1954 by Hermione, Countess of Ranfurly, after she moved to the Bahamas with her husband, Ulster-Scots Daniel Knox, 6th Earl of Ranfurly, who was Governor of the Bahamas. Upon touring the islands, Lady Ranfurly was shocked at the lack of reading materials available; she founded the Ranfurly Out Island Library service to provide books in the Bahamas. Over the years, she expanded her work throughout the Commonwealth of Nations and set up an organisation called The Ranfurly Library Service in London. In 1994, the Ranfurly Library Service changed its name to Book Aid International.

Prince Philip, Duke of Edinburgh was the charity's patron from 1966 until his death in April 2021. Queen Camilla has been patron since 2022.

In 2007 the Department for International Development ceased funding  Book Aid International, requiring them to reduce staff numbers and countries they work in. It is now entirely funded by a range of trusts, companies and individuals.

In 2014, the organisation celebrated its 60th anniversary. Since 2012, it has been directed by Alison Tweed, who replaced Clive Nettleton. In 2014, Lord Boateng became the charity's Chair.

Current work 
According to their Annual Report, in 2019 Book Aid International sent 1.2 million books to partners in 26 countries around the world. Many of these countries are in Africa but they also send books to support readers in Syria, Iraq and Greece.  

The charity is supported by book donations from the UK publishing industry and all the books they send are brand new.

The charity's website also details a number of programmes designed to train librarians and teachers as well as to create and support school libraries. These include:

 Inspiring Readers
 Children's Corners
 Reading for all: Kakuma Refugee Camp

Major book donors 
Book Aid International is supported by many publishers who donate books to the charity, which donations Book Aid International then sorts, selects according to need, and sends on to library services and NGO partners overseas. 

Major book donors include: 
 Amazon
 Andersen Press
 Baker Books
 Bloomsbury
 The British Library
 Co-ordination Group Publishing
 Cambridge University Press
 CTA
 Harlequin Mills & Boon
 HarperCollins
 Hachette UK
 International African Institute
 Macmillan
 Miles Kelly
 Oxford University Press
 Pearson
 Penguin Random House
 RELX Group
 SAGE Publications
 Walker Books
 Wiley
 Zed Books

Countries of operation 
The following countries receive significant donations of books from Book Aid International:
Cameroon
Eritrea
Ethiopia
Greece
Iraq
Kenya
Malawi
Occupied Palestinian Territories
Sierra Leone
Somalia
South Sudan
Tanzania and Zanzibar
Uganda
Zambia
Zimbabwe

Notes

Sources

External links
Official site
research paper Commissioned by Book Aid International and sponsored by the Commonwealth Foundation
Giorgia Cerruti, "Book Aid International: the power of partnerships", BookBrunch, 21 June 2021.

Development charities based in the United Kingdom
Charities based in London
Organizations promoting literacy